The Ligue 1 is the top tier men's basketball league in Guinea. The defending champion is SLAC, which won its sixth title in 2021. Most games of the league are played in the Palais des Sports next to the Stade du 28 Septembre in Conakry.

Current teams
In the 2021 season, the league featured six teams:
SLAC
Horoya Athletic Club
DRC
ASD
Asfo
Free

Champions 

 2014–15: SLAC
 2015–16: SLAC
 2016–17: SLAC
 2017–18: Magic Basket Club
 2018–19: SLAC
 2019–20: SLAC
 2020–21: SLAC

List of finals

In the Basketball Africa League

References

Basketball in Guinea
Basketball leagues in Africa
Sports leagues in Guinea